Janet Edith Woollacott (November 4, 1939 in Carlton, England – November 13, 2011 in Clamart, Hauts-de-Seine) was a British-born French singer of the 1960s to 2000s.

Biography
Woollacott was a dancer on the Côte d'Azur aged 20 when she met Claude François, Cloclo, in 1959, whom she married the following year. Only weeks before Claude François became a major star Woollacott left Claude François for Gilbert Bécaud, with whom she had a daughter, Jennifer Bécaud. The split was the subject of Claude François' bitter song "Je sais" (1964). Woollacott later wrote a book detailing the time shared with François. Claude François never remarried and died in 1978.

In later years she remarried three more times; to the producer Jean-Paul Barkoff, the Les Charlots comedian and singer Jean Sarrus and the composer Dominique Perrier. From 1994, she collaborated with Stone Edge, later renamed to Stone Age, the French/Breton Celtic techno band formed by her husband Dominique Perrier, with which she regularly performed and recorded songs, appearing on the band's best known album, "Time Travellers", as "Maureen" (1997).

Memoir
 Claude François, les années oubliées (1998)

Discography
 Je t’aime… normal et Super-gangsters, with Jean Sarrus (Vogue, 1970)
 Bénie soit la pluie (Sugar Me (Lynsey de Paul song)) and "Le chocolat" (Motors/Discodis, 1972)
 "Mama" and "The Dream", soundtrack from the film Adieu blaireau (Ariola Records, 1985)

With Stone Edge
 Stone Edge (Sony Records, 1995)

With Stone Age
 Time Travellers (Sony Records, 1997)
 Promessa (2000) 
 Totems d'Armorique (2007)

References

1939 births
2011 deaths
20th-century French women singers
People from Carlton, Nottinghamshire
21st-century French women singers